Rear Admiral Charles Gage Stuart,  (2 February 1887 – 1970) was a Royal Navy officer who, at the end of the Second World War, became Head of the Military Government of Guernsey.

Naval career
Stuart joined the Royal Navy in 1906. He served in the First World War, earning the Distinguished Service Cross for his role in the sinking of the German Cruiser  at the Battle of Más a Tierra in March 1915. He later received the Distinguished Service Order for service in the Baltic Sea in 1919.

Stuart became Captain of the Dockyard at Malta in 1932, Captain of the Dockyard at Chatham in 1935 and Captain-in-Charge at Simon's Town in 1937. He came to prominence at the end of the Second World War when he took control of the Island of Guernsey from the Germans in May 1945 and led a military government there until he was relieved by Lieutenant General Sir Philip Neame, the first post-war Lieutenant Governor of Guernsey in August 1945.

Family
In 1916 he married Elizabeth Ellen Buckland; they had two sons and two daughters.

References

|-

1887 births
1970 deaths
Royal Navy admirals of World War II
Companions of the Distinguished Service Order
Recipients of the Distinguished Service Cross (United Kingdom)